Bios or BIOS may refer to:

Arts, entertainment, and media
 Bios (album), the third album by Costa Rican music group Gandhi
Bios (novel), a 1999 science fiction novel by Robert Charles Wilson
BIOS, the original title of the American science fiction drama film Finch
 BIOS (journal), the society journal of the Tri Beta society
 BIOS Faction, a fictional group in the Allegiance video game
 "BIOS", a track on Blank Banshee's 2016 album MEGA

Computing
 BIOS (Basic Input/Output System), a de facto standard firmware interface of IBM PC-compatible computers
 AMI BIOS, manufactured by American Megatrends
 Award BIOS, manufactured by Award Software
 BIOS (CP/M), the BIOS in the CP/M family of operating systems
 Insyde BIOS, manufactured by Insyde Software
 Phoenix BIOS, manufactured by Phoenix Technologies
 DOS-BIOS, the equivalent of the CP/M component in some DOS operating systems, IBMBIO.COM in PC DOS
 IO.SYS, in MS-DOS
 NetBIOS

Organisations
 Bermuda Institute of Ocean Sciences
 Biological Innovation for Open Society
 BIOS-3, a closed ecosystem at the Institute of Biophysics in Krasnoyarsk, Russia
 BIOS Centre for the Study of Bioscience, Biomedicine, Biotechnology and Society, at the London School of Economics, United Kingdom
 British Institute of Organ Studies, for the study and appreciation of pipe organs

Other uses
 Bios (philosophy), a philosophical concept of Giorgio Agamben
 Biographies, or bios

See also
 Bio (disambiguation)
 ROS (disambiguation)